The Privacy and Electronic Communications (EC Directive) Regulations 2003 is a law in the United Kingdom which made it unlawful to, amongst other things, transmit an automated recorded message for direct marketing purposes via a telephone, without prior consent of the subscriber. The law implements an EU directive, the Privacy and Electronic Communications Directive 2002.

One of the key tenets of this legislation upholds that it is unlawful to send someone direct marketing if they have not specifically granted permission (via an opt-in agreement) in the absence of a previous relationship between the parties. Organisations cannot merely add people's details to their marketing database and offer an opt out after they have started sending direct marketing. For this reason the regulations offer increased consumer protection from direct marketing.

The regulations can be enforced against an offending company or individual anywhere in the European Union. The Information Commissioner's Office has responsibility for the enforcement of unsolicited e-mails and considers complaints about breaches. A breach of an enforcement notice is a criminal offence subject to a fine of up to £500,000 depending on the circumstances.

External links
 The Privacy and Electronic Communications (EC Directive) Regulations 2003

References

History of telecommunications in the United Kingdom
Statutory Instruments of the United Kingdom
2003 in British law
United Kingdom privacy law